Jolanda Benvenuti was an Italian film editor. She worked on more than a 150 productions during her career, including several films directed by Roberto Rossellini.

Selected filmography
 The White Primrose (1947)
 Ring Around the Clock (1950)
 Stromboli (1950)
 The Flowers of St. Francis (1950)
 The Ungrateful Heart (1951)
 Malavita (1951)
 Three Girls from Rome (1952)
 The Piano Tuner Has Arrived (1952)
 The Machine to Kill Bad People (1952)
 Europe '51 (1952)
 Deceit (1952)
 Naples Sings (1953)
 Storms (1953)
 We, the Women (1953)
 It Takes Two to Sin in Love (1954)
 Fear (1954)
 Giovanna d'Arco al rogo (1954)
 Letter from Naples (1954)
 The Island Monster (1954)
 Tragic Ballad (1954)
 Tears of Love (1954)
 Journey to Italy (1954)
 The Courier of Moncenisio (1956)
 The Most Wonderful Moment (1957)
 Adorabili e bugiarde (1958)
 Banditi a Orgosolo (1960)
 Akiko (1961)
 Toto's First Night (1962)
 Sexy Toto (1963)
 Sandokan the Great (1963)
 Three Nights of Love (1964)
 Hercules Against Rome (1964)
 Pirates of Malaysia (1964)
 Hercules and the Tyrants of Babylon (1964)
 Ghosts – Italian Style (1967)
 Assault on the State Treasure (1967)
 The Son of Black Eagle (1968)
 Tarzana, the Wild Girl (1969)
 Heads or Tails (1969 film) (1969)
 Tragic Ceremony (1972)

References

Bibliography 
 Bondanella, Peter. The Films of Roberto Rossellini. Cambridge University Press, 1993.

External links 
 

Year of birth unknown
Year of death unknown
Italian film editors
Italian women film editors